Abu Geraniyeh-ye Yek (also Romanized as Abū Gerānīyeh-ye Yek; also known as Abū Gereyneh-ye Yek) is a village in Shoaybiyeh-ye Sharqi Rural District, Shadravan District, Shushtar County, Khuzestan Province, Iran. At the 2006 census, its population was 135, in 16 families.

References 

Populated places in Shushtar County